Rankonosi is a mountain in Vang Municipality in Innlandet county, Norway. The mountain is surrounded by several other notable mountains including Grindane to the north, Klanten to the east, Blåkampen to the southeast, Ranastongi to the south, Storebotteggi to the southwest, and Ørnenosi and Øyre to the northwest.

See also
List of mountains of Norway by height

References

Vang, Innlandet
Mountains of Innlandet